HMS Vigilant was a Clydebank three-funnel, 30-knot destroyer purchased by the Royal Navy under the 1899–1900 Naval Estimates.  She was the ninth ship to carry this name since it was introduced in 1755 for an 8-gun schooner captured in 1756 by the French at Oswego.

Construction and career
She was laid down as a speculative build Yard No 116 at the John Brown and Company shipyard in Clydebank. She was purchased by the Royal Navy on 31 March 1900 and was launched on 19 August 1900. She was completed and accepted by the Royal Navy in June 1901. After commissioning she was assigned to the Channel Fleet in the Portsmouth Flotilla. She spent her operational career mainly in Home Waters, operating with the Channel Fleet.

On 30 August 1912 the Admiralty directed all destroyer classes were to be designated by alpha characters starting with the letter 'A'. After 30 September 1913, she was known as a C-Class destroyer and had the letter ‘C’ painted on the hull below the bridge area and on either the fore or aft funnel.

World War I
In July 1914 Vigilant was part of the Eighth Patrol Flotilla, based at Chatham.

In 1919, HMS Vigilant was paid off and laid-up in reserve, awaiting disposal.   She was sold on 10 February 1920 to South Alloa Ship Breaking Company for breaking at Charlestown near Rosyth on the Firth of Forth.

Pennant Numbers

References
NOTE:  All tabular data under General Characteristics only from the listed Jane's Fighting Ships volume unless otherwise specified

Bibliography

External links
 http://www.gwpda.org/naval/s0420000.htm

 

Ships built on the River Clyde
1900 ships
C-class destroyers (1913)
World War I destroyers of the United Kingdom